Šipka is a cave located near Štramberk, Moravian-Silesian Region, Czech Republic, 440 m above sea level. In 1880, a mandible of a Neanderthal child was found there. The age of the child has been estimated to be between 9 and 10 years.

The archeological work in Šipka was conducted from 1879 to 1893 by Karel Jaroslav Maška. The cave was probably alternatively inhabited by Neandertals and cave bears. The site also yielded Mousterian tools and traces of hearths. This was the first discovery of Neanderthal remains in their cultural context.

References

External links 
 
 Archeolog.cz: Description, site map, photo gallery and literature (in Czech).

1879 archaeological discoveries
Caves of the Czech Republic
Prehistoric sites in the Czech Republic
Neanderthal sites
Archaeological sites in the Czech Republic
Moravian Wallachia
Nový Jičín District
Mousterian